Harold Winton Johns (3 November 1903 – 14 February 1991) was an Australian rules footballer who played with Footscray in the Victorian Football League (VFL).

Notes

External links 

1903 births
1991 deaths
Australian rules footballers from Victoria (Australia)
Western Bulldogs players